Quincy, Omaha and Kansas City Railroad Office Building, also known as the O.K. Building and Sullivan County Courthouse, is a historic office building located at Milan, Sullivan County, Missouri.  It was built in 1898 by the Quincy, Omaha and Kansas City Railroad.  It is a two-story, rectangular brick building on a limestone foundation.  It features a Romanesque style round arched entrance and second-story window openings.  From 1908 to 1940, the building was used by Sullivan County as a courthouse and served as the seat of government for the county.

It was listed on the National Register of Historic Places in 1992.

References

Commercial buildings on the National Register of Historic Places in Missouri
Courthouses on the National Register of Historic Places in Missouri
Romanesque Revival architecture in Missouri
Office buildings completed in 1898
Government buildings completed in 1898
Buildings and structures in Sullivan County, Missouri
National Register of Historic Places in Sullivan County, Missouri